Guit County is a county located in Unity State, South Sudan, which has been impacted by the South Sudanese Civil War.

As of August 2015, outsiders had little if any access to Guit County, due to the fighting that began in Dec. 2013.

A large number of people were displaced during fighting in early 2015.

"According to SSRRA officials, besides 2540 vulnerable host population in Nimni, the payam is paying host to about 14,000 IDPs, most of them women and children. Nimni and the four adjacent payams are also hosting an aggregate of approximately 70,000 IDPs."

IRNA reported that Guit County had also suffered damage from flooding in August 2014.

As of April 2015, both animals and people were suffering a high morbidity rate due to difficult conditions.  "People are surviving on wild foods including water lilies, lalob fruit, and very limited fish. Large scale animal morbidity and mortality has meant diminishing milk production and unfavorable terms of trade for herders."

Notable people from Guit County include Taban Deng Gai, a Jikany Nuer who is aformer governor of Unity state, and a leader of the SPLM/A–IO.

Refugees from Werni in the eastern Nuba Mountains have accuse the Sudan Armed Forces (SAF) of using famine as a weapon to force them to flee.

References 

Counties of South Sudan
Unity (state)